Batrachoididae  is the only family in the ray-finned fish order Batrachoidiformes . Members of this family are usually called toadfish, or "frogfish": both the English common name and scientific name refer to their toad-like appearance (batrakhos is Greek for frog).

Toadfish are benthic ambush predators that favor sandy or muddy substrates where their cryptic coloration helps them avoid detection by their prey. Toadfish are well known for their ability to "sing", males in particular using the swim bladder as a sound-production device used to attract mates.

Description
Toadfish are usually scaleless, with eyes set high on large heads. Their mouths are also large, with both a maxilla and premaxilla, and often decorated with barbels and skin flaps. They are generally drab in colour, although those living on coral reefs may have brighter patterns.

The gills are small and occur only on the sides of the fish.  The pelvic fins are forward of the pectoral fins, usually under the gills, and have one spine with several soft rays. For the two separate dorsal fins, the first is smaller with spines, while the second has from 15 to 25 soft rays.  The number of vertebrae range from 25 to 47.

Toadfishes of the genus Porichthys, the midshipman fishes, have photophores and four lateral lines. All toadfishes possess sharp spines on the first dorsal fin and on the opercle (gill cover). In fish of the subfamily Thalassophryninae, these are hollow and connect to venom glands capable of delivering a painful wound to predators.

Distribution and habitat
Toadfishes are found worldwide. Most toadfish are marine, though some are found in brackish water and one subfamily, the Thalassophryninae, is found exclusively in freshwater habitats in South America. In particular, Daector quadrizonatus and Thalassophryne amazonica are known from the Atrato River in Colombia and the Amazon River, respectively.

Habits and reproduction
Toadfishes are bottom-dwellers, ranging from near-shore areas to deep waters. They tend to be omnivorous, eating sea worms, crustaceans, mollusks, and other fish.  They often hide in rock crevices, among the bottom vegetation, or even dig dens in the bottom sediments, from which they ambush their prey. Toadfish can survive out of water for as long as 24 hours, and some can move across exposed mudflats at low tide using their fins.

Males make nests, and then attract females by "singing", that is, by releasing air by contracting muscles on their swim bladders. The sound has been called a 'hum' or 'whistle', and can be loud enough to be clearly audible from the surface. The eggs are sticky on one side, so the female can attach them to the side of the nest. Each male attracts numerous females to his nest, so the eggs within have multiple mothers.

The male then guards the nest against predators. During this period, the male must survive on a limited supply of food, as he is not able to leave the immediate vicinity to hunt. The eggs rapidly develop into embryos, but these remain attached to the side of the nest until the age of about three to four weeks. After this time, they continue to cluster around and hide behind the male, until they are large enough to fend for themselves. This degree of parental care is very unusual among fishes.

Genera
About 83 species of toadfishes are grouped into 21 genera, as:

Order Batrachoidiformes
 Family Batrachoididae
 Subfamily Batrachoidinae
 Genus Amphichthys (two species)
 Genus Batrachoides (9 species)
 Genus Opsanus (six species)
 Genus Potamobatrachus (one species)
 Genus Sanopus (six species)
 Genus Vladichthys (one species)
 Subfamily Halophryninae
 Genus Allenbatrachus (three species)
 Genus Austrobatrachus (two species)
 Genus Barchatus (one species)
 Genus Batrachomoeus (five species) 
 Genus Batrichthys (two species)
 Genus Bifax (one species)
 Genus Chatrabus (three species)
 Genus Colletteichthys (three species)
 Genus Halobatrachus - Lusitanian toadfish (one species)
 Genus Halophryne  (four species)
 Genus Perulibatrachus (three species)
 Genus Riekertia - broadbodied toadfish (one species)
 Genus Triathalassothia (two species)
 Subfamily Porichthyinae
 Genus Aphos (one species)
 Genus Porichthys - midshipmen (14 species)
 Subfamily Thalassophryninae
 Genus Daector (five species)
 Genus Thalassophryne (six species)

Timeline of genera

Economics
Toadfish are not normally commercially exploited, but they are taken by local fishermen as a food fish, and by trawlers where they usually end up as a source of fishmeal and oil.  Some smaller toadfish from brackish-water habitats have been exported as freshwater aquarium fishes.

The western Atlantic species Opsanus tau, known as the oyster toadfish, is quite widely used as a research animal, while a few species, most notably Thalassophryne amazonica, are occasionally kept as aquarium fish.

See also 
List of fish common names
List of fish families

References

Further reading
 Nelson, Joseph S. (2006) "Order Batrachoidiformes" Fishes of the World (4th ed.) John Wiley & Sons, Hoboken, NJ,  pp. 248–249.
 Collette, B. B. "Order Batrachoidiformes, Batrachoididae, Toadfishes." In Carpenter, Kent E. (ed.) (2002) The living marine resources of the Western Central Atlantic Vol. 2, Bony fishes. Pt. 1 Acipenseridae to Grammatidae Food and Agriculture Organization of the United Nations, Rome (Special publication of the American Society of Ichthyologists and Herpetologists  no. 5) 
 Collette, B.B. and J. L. Russo (1981) "A Revision of the Scaly Toadfishes, Genus Batrachoides, with Descriptions of Two New Species from the Eastern Pacific" Bulletin of Marine Science 31(2): pp. 197–233.
 Hutchins, J.B. (1976) "A revision of the Australian frogfishes (Batrachoididae)" Records of the Western Australian Museum 4(1): pp. 3–43.
 
 CBC Radio Quirks and Quarks show podcast segment on unique toad fish habits with links to primary sources.

External links

FishBase entry on Batrachoididae

 
Venomous fish
Articles which contain graphical timelines
Extant Rupelian first appearances
Taxa named by David Starr Jordan